Juanita Sandra Bartlett (born January 6, 1966) is a Democratic member of the Maryland House of Delegates representing district 32.

Early life and education
Bartlett was born in Washington, D.C. on January 6, 1966; she attended Montgomery Blair High School and graduated in 1983. She received a B.A in English from Howard University in 1987, Bartlett also went to the University of San Diego and completed their ABA Accredited Lawyer's Assistant Program in 1992.

Legislative career
Sandy Bartlett was elected to the House of Delegates in 2018. Bartlett currently represents district 32 along with Delegate Mark Chang and Mike Rogers.

Legislative Assignments

2020 Deputy Majority Whip

2019 Judiciary Committee

2019 Civil Law and Procedure Subcommittee of the House Judiciary Committee

2019 Criminal Law and Procedure Sub-committee of the Judiciary Committee

2019 Joint Committee on Cybersecurity, Information Technology and Biotechnology

2020 Joint Committee on Legislative Ethics

2019 Workgroup to Study Shelter and Supportive Services for Unaccompanied Homeless Minors

2019 Legislative Black Caucus of Maryland

2019 Women Legislators of Maryland

2019 Maryland Legislative Latino Caucus, Associate Member

References

Living people
Democratic Party members of the Maryland House of Delegates
Howard University alumni
1966 births